Mattie E. Curry was the second Principal of the Eva Rose York Bible Training and Technical School for Women in Tuni.

After graduate studies at the Acadia University where she took a B. A., Curry moved to the Gordon–Conwell Theological Seminary studying for a B. Th.

References
Notes

Further reading
 

Canadian Indologists
Acadia University alumni
Canadian Baptist Ministries missionaries in India
Female Christian missionaries
Canadian Baptist Ministries